Mahankal, Kathmandu is a village and former Village Development Committee that is now part of Budanilkantha Municipality in Kathmandu District in Province No. 3 of central Nepal. At the time of the 1991 Nepal census, it had a population of 3,793 living in 710 households.

References

Populated places in Kathmandu District